Meliniomyces is a genus of fungi belonging to the family Hyaloscyphaceae.

The species of this genus are found in Europe, Northern America and Australia.

Species:

Meliniomyces bicolor
Meliniomyces variabilis
Meliniomyces vraolstadiae

References

Hyaloscyphaceae
Helotiales genera